"Firelight" is the third single from Dutch symphonic metal and rock band Within Temptation's seventh studio album Resist, and features guest vocals from Jasper Steverlinck of Arid. It was released worldwide via digital download and streaming on 23 November 2018.

Background
"Firelight" is a ballad song originally composed for Sharon den Adel's solo album My Indigo. The song was at that time considered too dark to fit the release, and then was put on hold. After meeting Jasper Steverlinck on a flemish tv show, den Adel invited the singer to do a part on the song as she found that they had a real connection and their voices matched well together. After some reworking, it then ended up appearing on den Adel's band Within Temptation seventh studio album Resist official tracklist. The song is considered dark and atmospheric and, according to Metal Hammer, it oscillates between a "mystic goth and dark folk" mood. It later entered the Ultratip Bubbling Under charts in Belgium.

Track listing

Personnel 
Within Temptation
Sharon den Adel – lead vocals
Ruud Jolie – lead guitar
Stefan Helleblad – rhythm guitar
Jeroen van Veen – bass
Martijn Spierenburg – keyboards
Mike Coolen – drums

Additional musicians
Jasper Steverlinck – guest vocals

Charts

References

2018 singles
2018 songs
Within Temptation songs
Songs written by Sharon den Adel
Male–female vocal duets